Heartland Christian Academy is a private school Christian in Shelby County, Missouri targeting K-12 students with behavioral issues. It has been subject to several investigations related to alleged abuse of students, often stemming from the school's use of corporal punishment. On October 30, 2001, state officials raided the school and 115 children were removed. The academy won a civil suit stating that the raid was unwarranted, and the court barred state officials from further removals without solid evidence of abuse.

Links and References

Christian schools in Missouri
Private schools in Missouri